The Golden PEN Award is a literary award established in 1993 by English PEN given annually to a British writer for "a Lifetime's Distinguished Service to Literature". The winner is chosen by the Board of English PEN. The award has previously been called the S.T. Dupont Golden Pen Award.

The award is one of many PEN awards sponsored by International PEN affiliates in over 145 PEN centres around the world.

Recipients

References

External links
Golden Pen Award, official website.

Awards established in 1993
1993 establishments in England
English PEN awards
Literary awards honoring lifetime achievement